The 1956 Western Michigan Broncos football team represented Western Michigan College (renamed Western Michigan University in 1957) in the Mid-American Conference (MAC) during the 1956 NCAA University Division football season.  In their fourth and final season under head coach Jack Petoskey, the Broncos compiled a 2–7 record (1–4 against MAC opponents), finished in sixth place in the MAC, and were outscored by their opponents, 168 to 114.  The team played its home games at Waldo Stadium in Kalamazoo, Michigan.

Center Bob Soderman was the team captain. End and tackle John Berryman received the team's most outstanding player award.

Jack Petoskey resigned as the team's head coach on December 13, 1956; he compiled a record of 8–25–2 in four years at Western Michigan.

Schedule

References

Western Michigan
Western Michigan Broncos football seasons
Western Michigan Broncos football